Eddie May (born 30 August 1967) is a former Scottish football player and coach.

Playing career
He played as a midfielder and full back for several clubs, including Hibernian, Falkirk and Motherwell during the 1980s and 1990s. When he joined Brentford in July 1989, May's £167,000 transfer fee was a then-club record.

Coaching career
After retiring as a player, May became a coach, developing young players for Falkirk. May was appointed as the manager of Falkirk in June 2009, with former player Steven Pressley and Alex Smith assisting him. His first competitive game was a 1–0 victory over FC Vaduz in the UEFA Europa League qualifying rounds, although Falkirk eventually lost their first ever European tie 2–1 on aggregate, becoming the first British club to lose a European tie to a club from Liechtenstein. May developed a reputation for being brutally honest during his spell in charge at Falkirk. May resigned as Falkirk manager soon afterwards, however, with the team bottom of the SPL.

May returned to football in June 2010, becoming a youth coach with Rangers. He was appointed high performance coach at the University of Stirling in August 2012. May returned to boyhood club Hibernian in August 2014 when he became their academy coaching manager. He was put in caretaker charge of the Hibernian first team in January 2019, after Neil Lennon was suspended by the club. After his first game in charge, May said that he was not interested in becoming a manager again because he had not enjoyed that role at Falkirk. May took charge of four games until Paul Heckingbottom was appointed head coach. May was again placed in caretaker charge in November 2019, after Heckingbottom was sacked. He managed one game during this spell, a 4–1 win at St Johnstone.

Managerial statistics

Acting role
May appeared for a brief goal in Rangers colours in the movie A Shot at Glory which also starred Robert Duvall, Ally McCoist, Brian Cox, Michael Keaton and Owen Coyle.

Honours
Falkirk
Scottish Challenge Cup: 1993–94

References

External links
 

Living people
1967 births
Scottish footballers
Scottish Premier League players
Scottish Football League players
English Football League players
Dundee United F.C. players
Hibernian F.C. players
Brentford F.C. players
Falkirk F.C. players
Motherwell F.C. players
Dunfermline Athletic F.C. players
Airdrieonians F.C. (1878) players
Berwick Rangers F.C. players
Scottish football managers
Falkirk F.C. managers
Rangers F.C. non-playing staff
Scottish Premier League managers
Scotland under-21 international footballers
Lothian Thistle Hutchison Vale F.C. players
Hibernian F.C. non-playing staff
Western Knights SC players
Scotland youth international footballers
Association football midfielders
Scottish expatriate sportspeople in Australia